Hans Dichgans (May 16, 1907 – March 21, 1980) was a German politician of the Christian Democratic Union (CDU) and former member of the German Bundestag.

Life 
In 1954 he became a member of the Christian Democratic Union of Germany and from 1955 was chairman of the CDU district group Lohausen-Stockum in Düsseldorf.

Dichgans was a member of the German Bundestag from 17 October 1961 to 22 September 1972 and was always elected via the state list of the CDU in North Rhine-Westphalia.  From 1961 to 1970 he was a member of the European Parliament.

Literature

References

1907 births
1980 deaths
Members of the Bundestag for North Rhine-Westphalia
Members of the Bundestag 1969–1972
Members of the Bundestag 1965–1969
Members of the Bundestag 1961–1965
Members of the Bundestag for the Christian Democratic Union of Germany
Christian Democratic Union of Germany MEPs
MEPs for Germany 1958–1979